Lingnan garden (Cantonese Jyutping: Ling5 naam4 jyun4 lam4; Traditional Chinese: 嶺南園林), also called Cantonese garden, is a style of garden design native to Lingnan – the traditionally Cantonese provinces of Gwongdung and Gwongsai in southern China. It, alongside the likes of Sichuanese garden and Jiangnan garden, is one of the major styles of Chinese garden.

The Lingnan region is the south of the Ng Leng Mountains, spanning southern Fujian, Gwongdung, and Gwongsai, located in the Eurasian continent's southeastern edge. With such a natural barrier as the Ng Leng Mountains and extensive river network, the region has strong sunlight and receives regular monsoon. Plants are lush throughout the year, showing a subtropical natural landscape. With this rich natural scenery, people in Lingnan have been able to create a rich and colorful style of traditional gardens distinct from gardens in other Han Chinese regions.

Classification

By types
Lingnan garden consists of several substyles, such as royal gardens, private gardens, public gardens, and so on. A good example of royal Lingnan garden is Gwongzau's Gauyiu Garden (Jyutping: Gau2 jiu6 jyun4; Traditional Chinese: 九曜園, literally "garden of nine glories"), built by Lau Ngam, the first king of Southern Han. Built in the style from the Five Dynasties and Ten Kingdoms period (10th century), it laid down the foundation of modern Lingnan style and is one of the more well-preserved gardens from that period. Prominent examples of private Lingnan gardens include the "four great gardens of central Canton": Yuyum Sanfong, Leung's Garden, Ching Fai Garden, and Ho Garden. Among them, Yuyum Sanfong is considered the best example of classical Lingnan garden, having used features such as lintels with stone carvings, mock mountains made of stone heaps, geometric pool shapes, and massive use of wood carvings.

By regions
Gwongdung's gardens have been the mainstream of Lingnan gardens. They have been noted for their inclusion of stone heaps as mock mountains, slowly rising roofs and alleys, various sculptures and carvings, contrasting colors of blue and green, and plants that bloom in all four seasons. Gwongsai's gardens tend to be based more on natural landscapes, manifested in stone cliffs and engraved walls.

Characteristics
Overall, the most commonly discussed characteristics of Lingnan garden include:

Layout
Lingnan garden primarily utilizes courtyard layout. The use of courtyard is a prominent trait of Lingnan garden, whose smallness and fineness are said to be comparable with those of classical Japanese garden. The vast majority of private Lingnan gardens use courtyard layout.

Elements

Artificial mountains
When it comes to artificial mountains (Jyutping: Gaa2 saan1; Traditional Chinese: 假山), Lingnan garden utilizes (1) cliffs; (2) islands; (3) artificial reefs; and (4) heaps. This style rarely uses mud to build artificial mountains.

Water
Lingnan garden is said to be heavily based around control of water, involving waterways of various patterns: (1) "cliff-waterfall-depth" pattern; (2) lake pattern; (3) depth without waterfall; (4) curving waterways; and (5) wellspring.

Stones
Lingnan garden uses a different set of stones from those used by Jiangnan and Northern Chinese gardens. It utilizes local minerals such as Minnan granite, Hainan coral stone, and Taiwan Guru stone. Gardens of this style prefer not to stack up its stones, but instead have them spread outward horizontally, with various methods and patterns of outward spreading.

Architecture

Lingnan garden uses towers, bridges, and corridors. This style either uses "high walls and cold lanes" to divide a garden into a combination of multiple courtyards, or simply connect the buildings and the courtyards as one single whole. The architecture involves high pillars, wide corridors, and thick walls. "Three carvings and three sculpting" (Jyutping: Saam1 diu1 saam1 sou3; Traditional Chinese: 三雕三塑) – carvings made of wood, brick and stone, and sculptures made of clay, mud, and granite – are prevalent. Classical Lingnan gardens utilize full gardens of three carvings and three sculpting, as shown in Bou Mak Garden (Jyutping: Bou2 mak6 jyun4; Traditional Chinese: 寶墨園, literally "Garden of Treasure and Ink") in Punyu, Gwongzau. Buildings in Lingnan garden are typically constructed in classical Lingnan style.

Calligraphy and paintings

Classical Lingnan garden uses calligraphy and paintings only sparingly, and modern Lingnan garden is even less inclined to do so. There are, however, several notable instances of such in Lingnan garden design. Yuyum Sanfong, for instance, has the calligraphy "餘地三弓紅雨足，蔭天一角綠雲深" (Classical Chinese, literally "This land is just as large as three bows, but rich in red rain; Though it is just a corner under the sky, it is abundant with green clouds") written on its main door.

Plants
Vegetation in Lingnan garden is summarized with the sentence "all-season flowers, scenery of tropical rain belt". Lingnan gardens use native, mainly subtropical plant species such as palm trees (including coconut trees), flamevine, orchids, Chinese banyan, and Lychee trees.

Philosophy

Lingnan garden is said to embody the philosophy behind Cantonese culture – commerce, pragmatism, and openness to foreign ideas. For much of the past millennium, Cantonese people have served as major merchants of the Chinese Empire, especially when it came to trade activities with Western Europeans and Southeast Asians. This results in a strong commercial tradition among Cantonese. This distinguishes them from other Han Chinese groups – such as the Northern groups, who have formed the empire's politicians and bureaucrats, or the Wuyue group, who have served prominently as scholars and artists. Cantonese gardens are less bounded by royal standards and frequently adopt foreign (i.e., non-Chinese) elements like stained glass. Also, Cantonese are far less heavily invested in Confucian philosophy, resulting in a style closer to the average people – such as a tendency to fuse gardens with buildings that have mundane purposes.

Brief history
According to historical records, people in Lingnan were already building gardens during the reign of the Nanyue king Ziu To (? – 137 BC) in Gwongzau. Their royal gardens took after the styles of the Qin Empire's. Afterwards, however, with the decline of the Nanyue regime, Lingnan royal gardens also disappeared. In much of the two millennia that followed, Lingnan had served as the fringe territory of various Chinese dynasties, resulting in a relative lack of royal garden styles. Nonetheless, the area around Gwongzau has become an important port for these dynasties, resulting in a gradual rise of the social and economic importance of the region. This and frequent cultural exchanges with outside powers caused the development of a folk garden style – the classical Lingnan garden.

Prominent Lingnan gardens

Yuyum Sanfong
Leung's Garden
Ching Fai Garden
Ho Garden
Bou Mak Garden

See also
Cantonese culture
Cantonese penjing
Sichuanese garden
Japanese garden
Korean garden
Chinese garden

References